Oscarito, stage name of Oscar Lorenzo Jacinto de la Inmaculada Concepción Teresa Diaz (August 16, 1906 – August 4, 1970) was a Spanish-Brazilian actor, considered to be one of the most popular comedians of Brazil.

Life
Born in a family of circus comedians, came to Brazil when he was one year old, but only became a naturalized citizen in 1949.

Made his debut in the circus at age five in 1914, where he learned to play the violin, besides being a clown, trapeze artist, acrobat and actor.

Made his debut in the revues in 1932, in the play Calma, Gegê, satirizing dictator Getúlio Vargas.

Made his debut in the cinema in Noites Cariocas (1935), although he had been an extra in a previous film (A Voz do Carnaval, 1933). He reached utmost fame with the comic duo he formed with Grande Otelo, in comedies directed by Carlos Manga and Watson Macedo.

He was married to Margot Louro and had two children, José Carlos and Mirian Thereza. In the morning of July 15, 1970, he suffered a stroke and was hospitalized, already in a coma. He died on August 4. His body was laid in the main hall of the Assembleia Legislativa do Rio de Janeiro, with the presence of more than two thousand people. The burial had the presence of five hundred people in the Cemitério São João Batista.

Filmography
 1975 – Assim era a Atlântida
 1968 – Jovens Para Frente
 1967 – A Espiã que Entrou em Fria
 1965 – Crônica da Cidade Amada
 1962 – Os Apavorados
 1962 – Entre Mulheres e Espiões
 1960 – Dois Ladrões
 1960 – Duas Histórias
 1959 – O Cupim
 1959 – Pintando o Sete
 1959 – O Homem do Sputnik
 1958 – Esse Milhão é Meu
 1957 – De Vento em Popa
 1957 – Treze Cadeiras
 1956 – Vamos com Calma
 1956 – Colégio de Brotos
 1956 – Papai Fanfarrão
 1955 – O Golpe
 1955 – Guerra ao Samba
 1954 – Matar ou Correr
 1954 – Nem Sansão nem Dalila
 1953 – Dupla do Barulho
 1952 – Três Vagabundos
 1952 – Carnaval Atlântida
 1952 – Barnabé, tu és meu
 1951 – Aí Vem o Barão
 1950 – Aviso aos Navegantes .... Frederico 
 1949 – Carnaval no Fogo
 1949 – Caçula do Barulho
 1948 – É com Este que Eu Vou
 1948 – Falta Alguém no Manicômio
 1948 – E o Mundo se Diverte
 1947 – Asas do Brasil
 1947 – Este Mundo é um Pandeiro
 1946 – Fantasma por Acaso
 1945 – Não Adianta Chorar
 1944 – Gente Honesta
 1944 – Tristezas não Pagam Dívidas
 1942 – Os Malandrões
 1941 – O Dia é Nosso
 1941 – Vinte e Quatro Horas de Sonho
 1940 – Céu Azul
 1938 – Banana da Terra
 1938 – Bombonzinho
 1938 – Está Tudo Aí!
 1936 – Alô, Alô Carnaval
 1935 – Noites Cariocas
 1933 – A Voz do Carnaval

References

External links

1906 births
1970 deaths
Spanish emigrants to Brazil
Brazilian male film actors
Brazilian male television actors
People from Málaga
20th-century Brazilian male actors